English Club TV is a TV channel for those who study English. The channel’s content consists of documentaries, feature films, cartoons and music videos, which are adapted for learning English. English Club TV programmes are broadcast in a special order.  They are divided into 6-hour blocks. Each 6-hour block consists of several mini-blocks that target different audiences with programmes on various topics. Each programme follows its own structure and delivery method. English Club TV creates its programmes following the main principles of the communicative approach. Each educational programme is a mini-lesson. It starts with presenting new material (vocabulary, grammar points) following by vivid examples, exercises and tests that enable the viewers to practise and make sure they understand the material. All  programmes include some of the following learning activities: watching and listening, answering the questions, filling in the gaps, multiple choice, matching, reading followed by a self-check, and repetition after the speaker. All programming content is divided into different themes and language knowledge levels, from elementary to advanced. English Club TV HD is a high-definition simulcast version of English Club TV channel. 
Watching English Club TV and English Club TV HD 15 minutes a day during a year, viewers will learn 2000 new words and 100 grammar structures. The English Club TV channel is available via Astra4A and Measat3A satellites which cover the European, Asian and Africa continents. As of June 2015, every day more than 16,000,000 subscribers of more than 400 operators watch English Club TV and English Club TV channels in 73 countries around the world.  English Club TV content is available through OTT, VoD, DTH, IPTV and mobile platforms.

History 
In August 2008, British TV Channel English Club TV started broadcasting from the Astra4A satellite. By the beginning of 2015, the channel’s audience had reached about 16 million people.

Programmes 
This day
Speak Up
English 911
City Grammar
Grammar Wise
Step by Step
Worth Seeing
Spot On the Map
Labour of Love
Perfect English
English Up
What did they say?
Basic Lexis
Art Land
Word Party
Crafty Hands
My little world
Kids in Action
Yummy for Mummy
A School Day in UK
Words to grow
English In Focus 
Magic Science 
Lets Sing 
Jack of all Trades
Let's talk
English is the key

Broadcasting 
English Club TV broadcasts from the Astra 4A and MEASAT 3A satellite.

English Club TV SD
Astra 4A at 4.8E
Transponder - B36
Frequency - 12399 MHz
Polarization - vertical (V)
Symbol rate - 27.5 Msymb/s
FEC - ¾
DVB-S MPEG-4
SID 7380
VPID 7381
APID 7383
Encryption: Viaccess 4.0

MEASAT 3A at 91.4 degrees East transponder 11
Satellite: HB 91.4 degrees East 
Transponder: 11 
Reception frequency: 4,120 MHz 
Reception polarity: H 
Symbol Rate: 30,000 MBaud 
FEC: 5/6

English Club TV HD

Astra 4A at 4.8E
Transponder - B36
Frequency - 12399 MHz
Polarization - vertical (V)
Symbol rate - 27.5 Msymb/s
FEC - ¾
DVB-S MPEG-4
SID 7390
VPID 7391
APID 7393
Encryption: Viaccess 4.0

Areas available 
Albania, Algeria, Angola, Austria, Benin, Bosnia and Herzegovina, Brazil, Bulgaria, Burkina Faso, Burundi, Cameroon, Canada, Central African Republic, Chad, China, Comoros, Congo, Croatia, Cyprus, Czechia, Democratic Republic of Congo, Djibouti, Equatorial Guinea, Estonia, Finland, France, Gabon, Gambia, Georgia, Greece, Ghana, Guinea Bissau, Guinea, Hungary, Indonesia, Italy, Ivory Coast, Kazakhstan, Kenya, Latvia, Lebanon, Liberia, Madagascar, Malawi, Malaysia, Mali, Mauritania, Moldova, Montenegro, Morocco, Nepal, Niger, Nigeria, Poland, Romania, Russia, Rwanda, Sao Tome, Senegal, Serbia, Seychelles, Sierra Leone, Singapore, Slovakia, Slovenia, South Korea, South Sudan, Sudan, Taiwan, Tanzania, The Republic of Belarus, Togo, Turkey, UAE, Uganda, Ukraine, Zambia, Zimbabwe.

As of June, 2015, English Club TV and English Club TV channels are broadcast by more than 400 cable operators all over the world.

External links 
 Official website of English Club TV

English as a second or foreign language
English-language television stations
Language education materials
Television channels and stations established in 2008
Educational and instructional television channels